Roslin in an Indian actress in Malayalam film and TV industry who won Kerala State Film Award for Second Best Actress for her role in 2003 movie ; Paadam Onnu: Oru Vilapam.

Filmography

 Padheyam (1993) - Nun
 Nee Varuvolam (1997) - Hari's mother
 Pranayavarnangal (1998) - Aarathi's chitta
 Kottaram Veettile Apputtan (1998) - Saraswathi
 Meenathil Thalikettu (1998)
 Janani (1999) - Sr. Victoria
 Aayiram Meni (1999) - Velichapad's wife
 Angene Oru Avadhikkalathu (1999) - Nirmala's mother
 Darling Darling (2000) - Savithri
 Nadan Pennum Natupramaniyum (2000) - Gayathri's mother
 Oru Cheru Punchiri (2000) - Jaanu
 Mazha (2000) - Patient's mother
 Vakkalathu Narayanankutty (2001) - Narayanakutty's mother
 Kanmashi (2002) - Lakshmi
 Sesham (2002) - Meera's mother
 Grandmother (2002) - 
 Sahodharan Sahadevan - Aarathi's mother
 Cheri (2003) - Savithri
 Paadam Onnu: Oru Vilapam (2003) - Rasaq's mother
 Bunglavil Outha (2005) - Thommichan's wife
 Iruvattam Manavaatti (2005) - Murali's mother
 Eakantham (2006) - Velayudhan's mother
 Naalu Pennungal (2007) - Kumari's mother
 Moonamathe Soochi (2007) - Balu's mother
 Daivathinu Award
 Boomi Malayalam (2009) - Nirmala's mother
 Hailesa (2009) - Ulpalakshan 's mother
 Vilapangalkkappuram (2009) - Nurse
 Decent Parties (2009) - Sreeja's mother
 Kadha, Samvidhanam Kunchakko (2009) - Kunchacko's mother
 Gulumaal: The Escape (2009) - Jerry's mother
 Aagathan (2010) - Sarojam
 Upadeshiyude Makan (2010) - Mariyamma
 Punyam Aham (2010) - Antharjanam
 Kaaryasthan (2010) - Shankaran Nair's wife
 Note Out (2011) - Pavithran's mother
 Raghuvinte Swantham Raziya (2011)
 Doctor Love (2011) - Yashodha
 Priyappetta Nattukare (2011) - Dasan's mother
 Thappana (2012) - Mallika's mother
 Masters (2012) - Nun
 Last Bench (2012) - Reji's mother
 Vallatha Pahayan (2013) - Seithali's wife
 Pedithondan (2014) - Kannan's mother
 On the Way (2014) - Manu's mother
 Central Theater (2014) - Vinay's mother
 Ellam Chettante Ishtam Pole (2015)
 Ennu Ninte Moideen (2015) - Appu's mother
 Thoppil Joppan (2016) - Roy's mother
 Ammavelicham (2016) - Maria's mother
 Snehasammanam (2016) - Sister
 Crossroad {Segment:Kaaval} (2017) - Devi's grandmother
 Navomi (2017) - Mohini's mother
 Pani
 Bhoomiyile Malakhamar (2020) - Rose
 Grandma Toy (2020) - Meenakshiyamma
 King Fish (2022) - Navas Ali's mother

TV serials

 Sundari (Surya TV)
 Ennum Sammadham (Mazhavil Manorama)
 Seethapennu (Flowers TV)
 Hridayam Snehasandram (Mazhavil Manorama)
 Kathayariyathe (Flowers TV)
 Seetha (Flowers TV)
 Bhramanam (Mazhavil Manorama)
 Sthreepadham  (Mazhavil Manorama)
 Ottachilambu (Mazhavil Manorama)
 Krishnathulasi (Mazhavil Manorama)
 Aniyathi (Mazhavil Manorama)
 Manjurukum Kalam (Mazhavil Manorama)
 Ramayanam (Mazhavil Manorama)
 Malakhamar (Mazhavil Manorama)
 Chakrvakam (Surya TV)
 Bhagyalakshmi (Surya TV)
 Nizhalkannadi (Surya TV)
 Velankani Mathavu (Surya TV)
 Sundari (Surya TV)
 Karuthamuthu (Asianet)
 Malayogam (Asianet)
 Nizhalukal (Asianet)
 Kanakuyil (Asianet)
 Sooryaputhri (Asianet)
 Amma (Asianet)
 Swantham Suryaputhri (Asianet)
 Thanichu (Asianet)
 Moonnam Naal (Asianet) - telefilm
 Karyam Nissaram (Kairali TV)
 Nirakoottu (Kairali TV)
 Vadakakkoru Hridayam (Amrita TV)
 Ponnum Poovum (Amrita TV)
 Valayam (DD Malayalam)
 Anantham (DD Malayalam)
 Alakal (DD Malayalam)
 Anna (DD Malayalam)
 Sneham

References

 https://www.malayalachalachithram.com/movieslist.php?a=6665
 https://malayalasangeetham.info/displayProfile.php?category=actors&artist=Roslin
 https://m3db.com/artists/30197

21st-century Indian actresses
Indian television actresses
Actresses in Malayalam television
Actresses in Malayalam cinema
Year of birth missing (living people)
Living people